"12 dage" is a song by Danish singer Medina from her third studio album For altid. It was released as the fourth single from the album on 26 March 2012. The song peaked at number 8 on the Danish Singles Chart.

Music video
A music video to accompany the release of "12 dage" was first released onto YouTube on 26 March 2012 at a total length of four minutes and thirty-six seconds.

Track listing
 Digital download (Album version)
 "12 dage" – 4:20

 Digital download single
 "12 dage" (Eaggerstunn Remix) - 4:10
 "12 dage" (Lucas Nord Remix) - 6:45
 "12 dage" (Dixone Remix) - 5:07

Chart performance

Release history

References

2010s ballads
2012 singles
Medina (singer) songs
Synth-pop ballads
2012 songs
Songs written by Jeppe Federspiel
Songs written by Rasmus Stabell
Songs written by Medina (singer)